Khimki trolleybus is a trolleybus system in Khimki, Moscow Oblast. Opened on 24 April of 1997... It is operated by Municipal Unitary Enterprise "Khimkielektrotrans".

History
First trolleybus route was open in trial mode at September 20, 1996 with 1 car. The regular operation started on April, 24 of 1997 with 5 cars in peak hours and 1 car in other time on the route.

On September 22, 2001 the first interregion route "2" started operation between Druzhbi street and metro station "Planernaya". January 1, 2005 route "2" changed its number to "22" because in Moscow Oblast all interregion routes should have numbers starting from 20, but, some months later, the route number was changed to "202", because in Moscow, another route "22" existed from 16 Parkovaya street to Komsomolskaya Square.

On September 7, 2006, route 1 was extended to "Rodina" Stadium. 

The most recent extension of the system happened on September 2, 2009, when the third route (203) started operation from "Rodina" Stadium to metro station "Planernaya".

A new trolleybus line, No.17, was planned to be launched on 1 January 2016, however, it has yet to enter operation.

From August 25, 2020 until 4 September 2020, routes 202 and 203 were the only trolleybus routes in Moscow because of the closure of the Moscow trolleybus.

In 2020 and 2021, 17 low floor trolleybuses were transferred from Moscow to Khimki due to the closure of the Moscow trolleybus system.

Routes 
There are currently three routes in operation:
 Route  1 - Druzhbi street - "Rodina" stadium
 Route 202 - Druzhbi street - Planernaya station
 Route 203 "Rodina" stadium - Planernaya station 
As routes 202 and 203 run into Moscow city, parts of it are controlled by the Moscow city government. This has led to disagreements in locations of stops and resulted in inconveniences in transferring from the Moscow Metro to either of the trolleybus lines.

Rolling stock
The rolling stock of Khimki trolleybus consist of 29 cars, most of them are Soviet-Russian trolleybuses ZiU-682G-016.05 and ZiU-682G-016 [G0M] (23 cars). Another 6 cars were purchased between 2013 and 2018, 4 cars are TrolZa-5265 "Megapolis" and 2 cars are VMZ-5298.01 "Avangard".

The number in Italics indicates cars that are temporarily out of service.

References

External links

Trolleybus transport in Europe